Leonard Stephen Righton (12 October 1898 – 14 February 1972) was a New Zealand rugby union player. Primarily a lock, Righton represented Auckland at a provincial level, and was a member of the New Zealand national side, the All Blacks, in 1923 and 1925. However, he missed selection for the 1924 "Invincibles" tour. He played nine matches for the All Blacks but did not appear in any internationals.

On 3 August 1927, Righton married Eileen Gladys O'Leary at St Patrick's Cathedral, Auckland. He died in Auckland on 14 February 1972.

References

1898 births
1972 deaths
Rugby union players from Auckland
New Zealand rugby union players
New Zealand international rugby union players
Auckland rugby union players
Rugby union locks